The 1966 U.S. Women's Open was the 21st U.S. Women's Open, held June 30 to July 3 at Hazeltine National Golf Club in Chaska, Minnesota, a suburb southwest of Minneapolis.

Sandra Spuzich, age 29, won her only major title, a stroke ahead of runner-up Carol Mann, the defending champion. A stroke back in third was four-time champion Mickey Wright. Spuzich was the 54-hole leader by a stroke over the two former champions and played in the final pair with Mann. It was the first of seven victories on the LPGA Tour for Spuzich.

The 36-hole cut at 162 (+18) reduced the field of 99 to 44, which included ten amateurs.

Designed by Robert Trent Jones and opened four years earlier in 1962, Hazeltine later hosted two U.S. Opens and two PGA Championships; the U.S. Women's Open returned in 1977.

Past champions in the field

Source:

Final leaderboard
Sunday, July 3, 1966

Source:

References

External links
Golf Observer final leaderboard
U.S. Women's Open Golf Championship
U.S. Women's Open – past champions – 1966
Hazeltine National Golf Club

U.S. Women's Open
Golf in Minnesota
Sports competitions in Minnesota
Chaska, Minnesota
Women's sports in Minnesota
U.S. Women's Open
U.S. Women's Open
U.S. Women's Open
U.S. Women's Open
U.S. Women's Open